Ricki Hill is a former Australian professional squash player.
Born in Sydney on 7 September 1960 he moved to London to find regular competition and became one of the leading Australian players in the 1980s.

References

Australian male squash players
Living people
1960 births
Sportspeople from Melbourne
20th-century Australian people
21st-century Australian people